The German swimming badge (German: Deutsches Schwimmabzeichen) is awarded by members of the Wasserwacht of the German Red Cross and the DLRG for completing certain requirements and for demonstrating swimming skills.

Requirements

German swimming badge in bronze
 200 meters swim in less than 15 minutes 
 1x Diving to a depth of 2 meters and retrieving a ring
 Proficiency in swimming rules
 One jump from springboard of 1 meter height

German swimming badge in silver
 400 meters swim in less than 25 minutes, 300 m breaststroke, 100 backstroke
 
 2x Diving to a depth of 2 meters and retrieving a ring
 10 meters underwater swim on one breath
 One jump from springboard of 3 meters height
 Proficiency in swimming rules

German swimming badge in gold  

 600 meters swim in less than 24 minutes
 50 meters sein breaststroke in less than 1 minute and 50 seconds
 25 meters crawl
 50 meters backstroke (50 meters in upside-down position with without arm activity)  
 50 meter backcrawl
 
 3x Diving to a depth of 2 meters and retrieving a ring in 3 minutes
 15 meters underwater swim on one breath
 One jump from a springboard of 3 meters height
 50 meters rescue pulling or pushing stroke
 Proficiency in swimming rules
 Knowledge of hazards and rescue measures for boat accidents or ice accidents

Unofficial badges

Badge for constant swimming
The Dauerschwimmer badge is awarded in 
 Bronze for one hour 
 Silver for one hour and a half
 Gold for two hours of constant swimming.

The design of the patch features a death's head. Due to the danger of hypothermia during the long exposure to water many swim coaches or lifeguards offer the badge for constant swimming only under strict conditions or not at all.

See also
 German rescue swimming badge
 List of German Sports Badges

References
 Info
 Data

swimming badge